My Phone Genie is a British children's television comedy-drama series about a young girl with a genie in her mobile. It premiered on 1 January 2012 and aired on ITV and CITV.

Production
My Phone Genie is co-produced by British company Talent Television, French company MoonScoop Group, and Irish company Telegael Teoranta, in association with ZDF, ZDF Enterprises and CITV.

The series is aimed at international audiences aged 12+.

Plot

Eleven-year-old Jasmine Hart downloads a free ringtone on her mobile phone and accidentally summons Gene the genie.

Cast and characters

Episodes

International broadcast
My Phone Genie airs on ITV and CITV in the United Kingdom, and ZDF in Germany.

References

External links

CITV

2012 British television series debuts
2012 British television series endings
2010s British children's television series
ITV children's television shows
British children's fantasy television series
2010s British television miniseries
English-language television shows